Plemons may refer to:
 Jesse Plemons (born 1988), American actor
 Plemons, Texas, a ghost town in Hutchinson County, in the U.S. state of Texas